The term Sanseki (三跡) or "three [brush] traces" is used in Japanese to refer to a group of three famous Heian period calligraphers:

Ono no Michikaze, known as Yaseki from the character 野 in his name.
Fujiwara no Yukinari, known as Gonseki from 権 in his court title.
Fujiwara no Sukemasa, known as Saseki from the character 佐 in his name.

See also
 Sanpitsu, a similar group of renowned calligraphers

References

Japanese calligraphers
Trios
Japanese culture-related lists